Exi(s)t is the second studio album by American metalcore band, Reflections. The album was released October 22, 2013 through labels eOne Music and Good Fight Entertainment. The album was produced by Eyal Levi, who has produced albums for bands such as August Burns Red, The Black Dahlia Murder, Motionless in White, Unearth, and Whitechapel.

The first single from Exi(s)t, titled "My Cancer," was released for download through iTunes and all other digital retailers on September 10, 2013. Reflections simultaneously released a lyric video for the single through their YouTube channel. Vocalist Jake Foster explained "My Cancer" and some of the background to their music writing: "This song was written to speak to a lot of people in my life and I hope that other people can use it the same way and connect with us... we aren't writing music as a gimmick. We write music to express our struggles and triumphs to try and let people know that they are not alone. We couldn't be more excited for everyone to hear the new song. Hopefully everyone enjoys the new album."

The album was leaked a few days prior to its actual release date.

Chart performance 
Exi(s)t debuted at #179 on the Billboard 200 chart, selling 1,972 copies within the first week of being released. The album made it onto five Billboard charts:
 Heatseeker Chart - #6
 Hard Rock Chart - #12
 Independent Album Chart - #35
 Top Current Album Chart - #179
 Digital Albums Chart - #130

The album also made it onto four of iTunes' album charts—three U.S. charts and one Canadian chart:
 iTunes Metal Album Chart - #1
 iTunes Rock Album Chart - #15
 iTunes Canadian Album Chart - #91
 iTunes Album Chart (all genres) - #68

Guitarist Charles Caswell was excited to have made it onto the charts: "We want to sincerely thank everyone for the continuing support of our debut record. It's unreal to think our music hit the charts! We can't express enough how much it means to us!"

Reception 

Exi(s)t was well-received by most critics, though some had nothing good to say of the album. Austin Weber from No Clean Singing spoke very positively, stating "Exi(s)t is a big step up from Reflections' promising but not yet diverse enough debut, The Fantasy Effect. Sonically, Reflections have matured into a band capable of giving us a very nasty, massive-sounding assault of heaviness, and yet the undercurrents of sadness and beauty that find their way into the music counterbalance the aggression nicely. The end result is both catchy and calming, a byproduct of Reflections writing in a more sophisticated format then most of their peers. With Exi(s)t, Reflections have just climbed up from the pile into elite status." Dave from Hellhound Music also had much positive to say of the album: "Every song on Exi(s)t is a sonic roller coaster blazing through with enormous depth and shockingly-raw personal exposition."

Metal Blast gave a very negative review, stating that Exi(s)t "frankly just isn't very good" and that "I rarely regret listening to an album... Exi(s)t... is one of those albums."

Track listing

Personnel 
Reflections
 Jake Wolf – lead vocals
 Patrick Somoulay – lead guitar
 Charles Caswell – rhythm guitar, second lead guitar, backup vocals
 Francis Xayana – bass
 Cam Murray – drums
Additional personnel
 Eyal Levi - production, recording, and mixing
 Alan Douches - mastering
 Jason Suecof - mix engineering
 John Douglas - assistant engineer
 Jeremy Frost - guitar technician
 Ronn Miller - drum technician
 Daniel Wagner - artwork and layout
 Jason Mageau - management
 Eric Powell - booking agent
 Greg Johnson - intro music production on "Exit"
 Becka Graham - vocals on "Lost Pages"

References 

2013 albums
Reflections (Minnesota band) albums
E1 Music albums